John "Yogi" Hughes (born 9 September 1964) is a Scottish professional football coach and former player.

Hughes played primarily as a central defender for several clubs, including Falkirk (two spells), Celtic, Hibernian and Ayr United. Towards the end of his playing career, Hughes took on coaching responsibilities, and was appointed manager of Falkirk in 2003 (initially as co-manager with Owen Coyle). Hughes guided the club to promotion to the Scottish Premier League and a Scottish Cup Final during his time in charge. He eventually left Falkirk to take up the managerial role at Hibernian in 2009, but left by mutual consent after sixteen months.

Hughes was appointed manager of Livingston in February 2012, but left in November to take over at English club Hartlepool United. He departed Hartlepool in May 2013 after being unable to prevent their relegation to League Two. Hughes was appointed manager of Inverness Caledonian Thistle in December 2013. He led the club to their first major silverware with the Scottish Cup in May 2015, and their first foray into European football, before he left in May 2016. Hughes then had a brief stint with Raith Rovers, which ended in them being relegated to Scottish League One. His next spell as a manager was with Ross County, where he managed to help them avoid relegation. Hughes was appointed Dunfermline Athletic manager in November 2021, but he resigned from this position in May 2022 following their relegation.

Playing career 
Hughes is "one of six kids from the classic, working-class family" in Leith. He started his playing career in junior football with Newtongrange Star, before beginning his senior career with Berwick Rangers, where he played as a striker. After a brief stint in the Football League with Swansea City, Hughes established himself as a central defender at Falkirk.

His playing career peaked when he signed for Celtic in 1995. He scored a late, headed equaliser in the Old Firm derby against Rangers at Ibrox on 17 March 1996.

He subsequently played for his local club Hibernian, Ayr United and finally returned to Falkirk in a joint player and coaching role.

Hughes shares his name with former Celtic, Crystal Palace and Sunderland player John 'Yogi' Hughes. As a result, Hughes is often referred to as 'Yogi' himself. He famously performed a streak during his first stint at Falkirk whilst team-mate Mo Johnston was being interviewed for STV's Scotsport.

Coaching career

Falkirk
Hughes landed his first managerial job in 2003, when he and Owen Coyle were appointed co-managers of Falkirk. Coyle subsequently left Falkirk to join Ian McCall at Dundee United, leaving Hughes in sole charge. He then guided Falkirk to promotion to the Scottish Premier League in 2005. As well as maintaining their SPL status for four seasons, Hughes led Falkirk to the 2009 Scottish Cup Final, losing 1–0 to Rangers.

Hibernian
Hughes was appointed Hibernian manager in the 2009 close season. He led the club to Europa League qualification in his first season in charge, as they finished in fourth place in the SPL. Poor results at the start of the following season, however, led to fans jeering their own team. Hughes left the club by mutual consent on 4 October following a 2–0 defeat against St Johnstone.

Livingston
Hughes interviewed for the Swindon Town job in the 2011 close season. Hughes was appointed manager of Livingston on 14 February 2012.

Hartlepool
After nine months at Livingston, Hughes moved to English club Hartlepool United. He took the job when the team were in the midst of a 20-match-run without a win. Despite an upturn in form that earned him a Manager of the Month award, Hartlepool were relegated to Football League Two. Hughes publicly stated his desire to remain at the club, but he was sacked on 9 May 2013.

Inverness Caledonian Thistle
Hughes was appointed manager of Scottish Premiership club Inverness Caledonian Thistle on 4 December 2013 on a two-and-a-half-year contract. Soon after this appointment, Hughes led Inverness CT to their first major final after beating Hearts in a penalty shoot-out in the semi-final of the 2013–14 Scottish League Cup. Inverness drew 0–0 against Aberdeen in the final, but, after extra-time, lost the tie 4–2 on penalties.

At the beginning of season 2014–15, Caley Thistle's excellent early performances led him to receive the award of SPFL Manager of the Month for August. He followed this by also winning the award for January 2015, as his Inverness side continued to impress. In April 2015, Hughes led Caley Thistle to their first ever Scottish Cup final after a controversial 3–2 win over favourites Celtic, and at the end of the month he was shortlisted for PFA Scotland Manager of the Year. On 3 May, Hughes was announced as the winner of the managerial award ahead of Ronny Deila, Derek McInnes and Robbie Neilson. Further success soon followed as he guided Inverness to a highest ever league finish – 3rd place, and with it, a milestone debut in European competition for the club. The accolades continued, with Hughes winning the SFWA Manager of the Year award, to complete the managerial 'double' for 2014–15. He led the club to their first major silverware with a Scottish Cup final success over his old club Falkirk in the 2015 Scottish Cup Final to conclude the club's most successful season.

Hughes left Inverness at the end of the 2015–16 season.

Raith Rovers
Hughes was appointed manager of Scottish Championship club Raith Rovers in February 2017. The club finished ninth in the Championship, and were relegated to League One after they lost in the play-offs to Brechin City. Immediately after the game, Raith announced that Hughes and his assistant Kevin McBride would be leaving the club.

Ross County
On 21 December 2020, Scottish Premiership club Ross County appointed Hughes as their manager until the end of the season. He guided the club to a tenth-place finish in the Premiership, avoiding relegation, and he left at the end of his contract.

Dunfermline Athletic
Hughes became manager of Scottish Championship club Dunfermline Athletic in November 2021. The club finished ninth in the Championship and were relegated to League One after they lost in the play-offs to Queens Park. Hughes resigned later that month.

Managerial statistics

Honours and achievements

Player
Falkirk
Scottish First Division: 1993–94, 2002–03
Scottish Challenge Cup: 1993–94

Hibernian
Scottish First Division: 1998–99

Manager
Falkirk
 Scottish First Division: 2004–05
Scottish Challenge Cup: 2004–05
Stirlingshire Cup: 2006–07, 2007–08
Scottish Cup: runners-up 2008–09

Inverness Caledonian Thistle
Scottish Cup: 2014–15
Scottish League Cup: runners-up 2013–14

Individual
 SPL Manager of the Month: December 2006
 SPL Manager of the Month: September 2009
 League One – Manager of the Month: February 2013
 SPFL Manager of the Month: August 2014
 SPFL Manager of the Month: January 2015
 PFA Scotland Manager of the Year: 2014–15
 SFWA Manager of the Year: 2014–15

References

External links

1964 births
Association football central defenders
Association football forwards
Ayr United F.C. players
Berwick Rangers F.C. players
Celtic F.C. players
Dunfermline Athletic F.C. managers
Falkirk F.C. managers
Falkirk F.C. players
Hartlepool United F.C. managers
Hibernian F.C. managers
Hibernian F.C. players
Inverness Caledonian Thistle F.C. managers
Living people
Livingston F.C. managers
People from Leith
Scottish Football League managers
Scottish Football League players
Scottish football managers
Scottish footballers
Scottish Junior Football Association players
Scottish Premier League managers
Scottish Premier League players
Footballers from Edinburgh
Swansea City A.F.C. players
English Football League managers
English Football League players
Scottish Professional Football League managers
Raith Rovers F.C. managers
Ross County F.C. managers